Thomas Røed (born 26 May 1974) is a retired Norwegian football midfielder.

He started his youth career in Lier IL and is the older brother of Vegard Røed.

Røed spent much of his career with Odd Grenland, playing for the club from 1999 through the 2003 season and winning the Norwegian Cup in 2000. In 2004, he moved to the second-tier club Pors Grenland and scored one goal there. He also played for Odd Grenland in European competition, appearing in the 2001-02 UEFA Cup qualifying round against Helsingborgs IF.

References

1974 births
Living people
Sportspeople from Drammen
Norwegian footballers
Strømsgodset Toppfotball players
Odds BK players
Pors Grenland players
Association football forwards 
Association football midfielders